New Nigerian was a Nigerian newspaper based in Kaduna.

Political allegiance 
The newspaper was allegedly to be a linked with the Kaduna Mafia, a loose group of Nigerian businessmen, civil servants, intellectuals and military officers from Northern Nigeria.

Editors 

 Adamu Ciroma – 1966 to 1974
 Mamman Daura – 1969 to 1973

General Manager (Operations) 

 Dn. Stephen K. Vihishima – 1968 to 1988

See also 

 List of Nigerian newspapers

References 

Publications established in 2011
Newspapers published in Abuja
2011 establishments in Nigeria
Daily newspapers published in Nigeria
Online newspapers published in Nigeria